Jacob's Ladder is a 1921 thriller novel by the British writer E. Phillips Oppenheim. Oppenheim was prolific, bestselling author whose popularity reached its height during the interwar years. The novel was published in America by  Little, Brown.

Synopsis
Once a derided bankrupt a man rises to become a millionaire but faces various attempts to swindle him.

References

Bibliography
 Bloom, Clive. Bestsellers: Popular Fiction since 1900. Springer, 2008.
 Reilly, John M. Twentieth Century Crime & Mystery Writers. Springer, 2015.
 Server, Lee. Encyclopedia of Pulp Fiction Writers. Infobase Publishing, 2014. 
 Standish, Robert. The Prince of Storytellers: The Life of E. Phillips Oppenheim. P. Davies, 1957.

1921 British novels
Novels by E. Phillips Oppenheim
British thriller novels
Hodder & Stoughton books
Novels set in England